The Kingsville Micropolitan Statistical Area is a micropolitan area in South Texas that covers two counties – Kleberg and Kenedy. As of the 2000 census, the μSA had a population of 31,963 (though a July 1, 2009 estimate placed the population at 31,016). It is also part of the larger Corpus Christi-Kingsville Combined Statistical Area.

Counties
Kenedy
Kleberg

Communities
Armstrong (unincorporated)
Kingsville (principal city)
Loyola Beach (unincorporated)
Ricardo (unincorporated)
Riviera (unincorporated)
Sarita (unincorporated)
Vattmann (unincorporated)

Demographics
As of the census of 2000, there were 31,963 people, 11,034 households, and 7,791 families residing within the μSA. The racial makeup of the μSA was 71.78% White, 3.66% African American, 0.61% Native American, 1.46% Asian, 0.10% Pacific Islander, 19.17% from other races, and 3.23% from two or more races. Hispanic or Latino of any race were 65.58% of the population.

The median income for a household in the μSA was $27,157 and the median income for a family was $29,887. Males had a median income of $24,652 versus $15,841 for females. The per capita income for the μSA was $15,751.

See also
List of cities in Texas
Texas census statistical areas
List of Texas metropolitan areas

References

 
Geography of Kenedy County, Texas
Geography of Kleberg County, Texas
Micropolitan areas of Texas